Rodrigo Dias Carneiro, known as Rodrigão (born 20 May 1972) is a former Brazilian football player.

Club career
He played 5 seasons and 94 games in the Primeira Liga for Braga and União Madeira.

International
He represented Brazil at the 1991 FIFA World Youth Championship.

References

External links
 

1972 births
People from Uberlândia
Sportspeople from Minas Gerais
Living people
Brazilian footballers
Brazil youth international footballers
CR Flamengo footballers
Botafogo de Futebol e Regatas players
C.F. União players
Brazilian expatriate footballers
Expatriate footballers in Portugal
Primeira Liga players
Liga Portugal 2 players
S.C. Braga players
Sporting de Gijón players
Expatriate footballers in Spain
La Liga players
Málaga CF players
Club Athletico Paranaense players
Al Hilal SFC players
Expatriate footballers in Saudi Arabia
Saudi Professional League players
Association football midfielders